Shopsin's General Store is a diner in New York City, known for its extensive menu and the personality of its namesake chef/owner, Kenny Shopsin.  It first opened in the 1970s in the city's Greenwich Village neighborhood, but is now located in Essex Market in the Lower East Side.

Neighborhood grocery

Shopsin's first iteration was as a neighborhood grocery at the corner of Bedford Street and Morton Street in Greenwich Village. It, the stock and good will, but not the building, was purchased by Kenny Shopsin for $25,000 in 1973, using money from his father. He was undergoing intensive Freudian psychoanalysis at the time and lived in the neighborhood. The previous owner had prepared and sold roast beef, a practice Shopsin continued.

The restaurant
Shopsin's is known for both its extensive (900-item) menu of unusual dishes concocted by chef/owner Kenny Shopsin, including items such as "Slutty Cakes", pancakes with peanut butter in the middle, and "Blisters on My Sisters", similar to huevos rancheros, and for Kenny Shopsin himself, described by Time Out New York as "the foul-mouthed middle-aged chef and owner".  Among Kenny Shopsin's quirks were his very specific rules, including that the restaurant will not accept parties of more than four people. "Pretending to be a party of three that happened to have come in with a party of two is a very bad idea," wrote journalist and restaurant regular Calvin Trillin.

The restaurant and Kenny Shopsin were the subject of articles in  The New Yorker by Trillin, and of the documentary film I Like Killing Flies, directed by Matt Mahurin. An effort to re-create Shopsin's "Slutty Cakes" was described in a January 2009 Slate article.

In 2008, Shopsin wrote a cookbook, Eat Me: The Food and Philosophy of Kenny Shopsin.

Shopsin died on September 2, 2018, at his home in the West Village.

See also
 List of restaurants in New York City

References

External links
 

Restaurants in Manhattan
1970s establishments in New York City
Chinese restaurants in New York (state)